ASC Kédia is a Mauritanean football club based in Zouérat the capital of the Tiris Zemmour region.
The club plays in the Mauritanean Premier League.

Stadium
Currently the team plays at the 1000 capacity Stade Municipal Zouérate.

References

External links
Soccerway

Football clubs in Mauritania